There were approximately 120 general officers from Massachusetts who served in the Union Army during the American Civil War. This list consists of generals who were either born in Massachusetts or lived in Massachusetts when they joined the army (in the case of Regular Army officers, the date that they joined army might have preceded the Civil War by many years).  The list includes both  Regular and Volunteer Army generals as well as those who received the temporary or honorary rank of brevet brigadier general.

Union

Confederate
Charles Adams
Albert Blanchard
Charles Dimmock
Edward A. Perry
Albert Pike
Daniel Ruggles
Claudius W. Sears

See also

Massachusetts in the American Civil War
List of Massachusetts Civil War units

References
 Bowen, James L., Massachusetts in the War, 1861–1865, Clark W. Bryan & Co., 1889.

People of Massachusetts in the American Civil War
Generals of the American Civil War